The United States Department of Defense acknowledges holding twelve Sudanese captives in Guantanamo. A total of 779 captives have been held in extrajudicial detention in the Guantanamo Bay detention camps, in Cuba since the camps opened on January 11, 2002
The camp population peaked in 2004 at approximately 660.  Only nineteen new captives, all "high value detainees" have been transferred there since the United States Supreme Court's ruling in Rasul v. Bush.  As of December 2013 the camp population stands at approximately 160.

List of Sudanese citizen at Guantanamo

References

Lists of Guantanamo Bay detainees by nationality
Sudan–United States relations